Palmetto Theater was a historic movie theater located at Spartanburg, Spartanburg County, South Carolina.  It was built in 1940–1941, and was a one-story, rectangular plan brick building.  It featured a large marquee and a separate shop storefront decorated in blue Carrera-glass panels. The interior featured double balconies, Terrazzo flooring, large Art Deco light fixtures, decorative wall painting, and a plaster Art Deco screen surround.

It was listed on the National Register of Historic Places in 1996. It has since been demolished.

References

Theatres on the National Register of Historic Places in South Carolina
Buildings and structures in Spartanburg, South Carolina
National Register of Historic Places in Spartanburg, South Carolina
Theatres completed in 1941